Ellyes Joris Skhiri (born 10 May 1995) is a professional footballer who plays as a midfielder for Bundesliga club 1. FC Köln. Born in France, he plays for the Tunisia national team.

Club career

Montpellier
Skhiri is a youth product of Montpellier HSC. He made his Ligue 1 debut on 21 March 2015 against Evian Thonon Gaillard replacing Paul Lasne in extra time in a 1–0 away defeat.

1. FC Köln
On 29 July 2019, Skhiri joined 1. FC Köln on a four-year deal. On 28 November 2020, he scored a brace in a 2–1 away win over Borussia Dortmund.

International career
Skhiri was born and raised in France to Tunisian father and French mother. He was called up to the Tunisia Olympic team several times. Skhiri made his debut for the Tunisia Olympic team in a friendly against the Morocco U23 squad.

Skhiri made his senior debut for the Tunisia national football team in a friendly 1–0 win over Iran on 23 March 2018.

In June 2018, he was named in Tunisia's 23-man squad for the 2018 World Cup in Russia. He was part of the national team which reached the semi-finals of the 2019 Africa Cup of Nations. In November 2022, he was called up for the 2022 FIFA World Cup in Qatar.

Career statistics

International

Scores and results list Tunisia's goal tally first, score column indicates score after each Skhiri goal.

Honours
Tunisia
Africa Cup of Nations 4th place: 2019
Individual
 Tunisian Footballer of the Year: 2021

References

1995 births
Living people
People from Lunel
Sportspeople from Hérault
Association football midfielders
Citizens of Tunisia through descent
Tunisian footballers
Tunisia international footballers
Tunisia under-23 international footballers
French footballers
French sportspeople of Tunisian descent
Tunisian people of French descent
Ligue 1 players
Montpellier HSC players
Bundesliga players
1. FC Köln players
Tunisian expatriate footballers
French expatriate footballers
Expatriate footballers in Germany
Tunisian expatriate sportspeople in Germany
French expatriate sportspeople in Germany
2018 FIFA World Cup players
2019 Africa Cup of Nations players
2021 Africa Cup of Nations players
2022 FIFA World Cup players
Footballers from Occitania (administrative region)